Joshua Imai Pol Kaakha is an upcoming Indian Tamil-language action thriller film written and directed by Gautham Vasudev Menon. Produced by Ishari K. Ganesh of Vels Film International, the film stars Varun, Krishna and Raahei, with music composed by Karthik. The film narrates the tale of a bodyguard who has to look after and protect a high-profile woman who comes to Chennai from London. The film was expected to have a theatrical release in late 2020, but production was halted due to the COVID-19 pandemic in India.

Cast

Production

Pre-production 
In September 2017, Gautham Vasudev Menon announced his new project with Arun Vijay in the leading role, after re-establishing him in Yennai Arindhaal (2015) and it eventually marked the actor 25th film in the leading role. Touted to be an action thriller, in which Arun Vijay playing the role of a bodyguard for a rich entrepreneur, the film featured high octane stunt sequences. Arun Vijay lost weight in order to sport a ripped physique in the film. Gautham Menon who started working on the pre production of the project planned to shoot for the film during January 2018, whereas Arun Vijay trained for the project in Paris with stunt director Yannick Ben. But the film was put on hold in mid-2017 after Menon encountered financial constraints. While Menon planned to revive the project in April 2019, he approached Suriya for the leading role, but Suriya declined as he found the script too similar to that of his other film Kaappaan (2019).

Development 
In July 2019, Menon agreed on terms to work on a film produced by Ishari K. Ganesh of Vels Film International during July 2019, following the producer's sudden intervention to relieve Menon from financial constraints that he faced during the making of Enai Noki Paayum Thota (2019). In return, Menon agreed to make a film starring Ganesh's nephew, Varun, in the lead role. Varun, who was shooting for Seeru in which he had gained weight to 94 kilograms for the film, subsequently lost 22 kilos in order to achieve a sportive look, whereas Menon decided to revive the script with Varun, which was originally meant for Arun Vijay. Media reports initially suggested that the film would be based on the script of Yohan: Adhyayam Ondru, which was originally planned with Vijay in 2011, but Menon denied this and claimed it was a separate story.

To prepare for his role, Varun trained with Yannick Ben and his team of stunt directors and parkour experts in Paris during mid-2019. Debutant actress Raahei was also cast in the film as a high net-worth individual, who is protected by Varun's character. Darbuka Siva was initially announced as the music composer in November 2019 after working with Menon in Enai Nokki Paayum Thota, but was later replaced by playback singer Karthik in February 2020. While the antagonist role of the film was kept under wraps, in July 2020, it was revealed that Krishna will play the main antagonist. Krishna trained stunt sequences under Yannick Ben who also choreographed action sequences for this film.

Filming 
Principal photography of the film began in October 2019. By November 2019, fifty percent of the film was completed in single stretch through a schedule in Chennai. The makers shot seven action sequences during January 2020, which include car fights and chasing sequences, and then prepared to shoot scenes in the UK and the US. However, as of June 2020 filming was delayed due to the COVID-19 pandemic. As of early March 2021, the film was nearing completion, with only two or three days of "patch-work" remaining. Varun began dubbing his lines in April 2022.

Soundtrack 
The film's soundtrack and score is composed by Karthik, in his third film as composer after Aravaan (2012) and Tamilselvanum Thaniyar Anjalum (2016). The first single from the film "Hey Love" sung by Shashaa Tirupati and written by Vignesh Shivan was released on 29 February 2020. The video song of the second single "Naan Un Joshua" was released on 17 July 2020, along with the single in music platforms. The third single "Tappasu Neram" was released on 11 December 2021.

References

External links 

 

Film productions suspended due to the COVID-19 pandemic
Films directed by Gautham Vasudev Menon
Indian action thriller films
Upcoming films
Upcoming Tamil-language films